Provinces of Indonesia are the 38 administrative divisions of Indonesia and the highest tier of the local government (formerly called first-level provincial region or ). Provinces are further divided into regencies and cities (formerly called second-level region regencies and cities or ), which are in turn subdivided into districts (kecamatan).

Background
Article 18 paragraph 1 of The 1945 Constitution states that "The Unitary State of the Republic of Indonesia is divided into provincial regions and those provincial regions are divided into regencies and city, whereby every one of those provinces, regencies, and municipalities has its regional government, which shall be regulated by laws." 

According to the Law on Regional Government (UU 23/2014) the authority of the Provincial Government includes:

 Development planning and control;
 Planning, utilization, and community peace;
 Implementation of public order and public peace;
 Provision of public facilities and infrastructure;
 Handling the health sector;
 Education and allocation of potential human resources;
 Handling social problems across regencies/cities;
 Services in the field of manpower across regencies/cities;
 Facilitating the development of cooperatives, small and medium enterprises, including across districts/cities;
 Environmental control;
 Defense services, including across regencies/cities;
 Population and civil registration services;
 Government general administration services;
 Investment administration services, including across regencies/cities;
 The implementation of other basic services that cannot be carried out by regencies/cities; and
 Other mandatory affairs mandated by laws and regulations.

The authority of the provincial government are government affairs which are located across regencies/municipalities, government affairs whose users are across regencies/municipalities, government affairs whose benefits or negative impacts lie across regencies/municipalities, government affairs which use more resources. efficient if carried out by the province.

Each province has a local government, headed by a governor and a legislative body (DPRD). The governor and members of local representative bodies are elected by popular vote for five-year terms, but governors can only serve for two terms. The general election to elect members of the DPRDs is conducted simultaneously with the national general election. Previously, the general elections for Governor and Vice Governor were not held simultaneously. However, since 2015 regional head elections have been held simultaneously. Under the plan, simultaneous partial local elections will be held in February 2017, June 2018, December 2020, culminating in simultaneous elections for all local executive posts on November 2024 and then every five years.

Current provinces
After the creation of Southwest Papua, Indonesia now has 38 provinces: 29 ordinary provinces and 9 provinces that have special status. The 1945 Constitution mentions that the state of Indonesia acknowledges and respects the special status of some of its regional governments. The special status is divided into two separate characteristics which in Indonesian are "Istimewa" and "Khusus". The main meaning for both is special in English, however, Istimewa could also be translated to "privileged".

Seven provinces in Indonesia that have special characteristics are:

  Special Capital Region of Jakarta, which has the special status as the capital city of Indonesia.

One province has "privileged" characteristics:

  Special Region of Yogyakarta, which has Sultan Hamengkubuwono as its hereditary governor and Adipati Paku Alam as its hereditary vice-governor. Basically a sultanate under a republic.

One province has both characteristics:

  Aceh, which has the special and privileged status of implementation of Islamic sharia law in religious life, customary life, and education.

Geographical units

The provinces are officially grouped into seven geographical units for statistical and national planning purposes, but without administrative function.

Table of provinces

Former provinces

Upon the independence of Indonesia, eight provinces were established. West Java, Central Java, East Java, and Maluku still exist as of today despite later divisions, while Sumatra, Kalimantan, Sulawesi, and Nusa Tenggara, formerly Lesser Sunda (Sunda Kecil) were fully liquidated by dividing them into new provinces. The province of Central Sumatra existed from 1948 to 1957, while East Timor was annexed as a province from 1976 until its power transfer to UNTAET in 1999 prior to its independence as a country in 2002.

New provinces made from currently-existing provinces

Renamed provinces

Former provincial capitals
Tanjungpinang to Pekanbaru, Riau (until 1959)
Jakarta to Bandung, West Java (until 1960)
Singaraja to Denpasar, Bali (until 1960)
Soasio, Tidore to Sukarnopura, West Irian (1956–1963)
Dili, East Timor (1975–1999), later became the capital of Democratic Republic of Timor-Leste
Ternate to Sofifi, North Maluku (until 2010)
Banjarmasin to Banjarbaru, South Kalimantan (until 2022)

See also

 List of regencies and cities of Indonesia
 Subdivisions of Indonesia

Notes

References

 
Provinces, Indonesia
Provinces
Provinces
Subdivisions of Indonesia